Pranitha Vardhineni is an Indian Recurve Archer.

Early years 
Pranitha Vardhineni was introduced to archery during her school years at the Rural Development Foundation's Kalleda Rural School in Warangal District, Telangana State, India. It was from here that she won a Bronze medal at the National Sub-Junior Archery Championships in 2004. This notable win led to her selection into the prestigious Tata Archery Academy in Jamshedpur, India.

Employment 
Pranitha Vardhineni was employed at the Indian railways, Bilaspur, Chhattisgarh.

Since 2013, she has been working as an Archery Coach with the Sports Authority of India. She is currently posted at the Sports Training Centre in Gachibowli, Hyderabad.

National achievements 
Between 2004 and 2013, Pranitha Vardhineni participated in twelve national level archery competitions and secured a medal in eleven of them.

International achievements 
Between 2006 and 2015, Pranitha Vardhineni represented India in twenty one international archery competitions and secured a medal in twelve of them.

2008 Summer Olympics, Beijing
Pranitha Vardhineni represented India in the women's individual and team archery events at the 2008 Summer Olympics in Beijing. In the individual event, she was ranked 31st in the qualifiers. She defeated Jane Waller of Australia by 106-100 in the round of 64, but lost to Kwon Un Sil of North Korea by 99-106 in the round of 32. She teamed up with Dola Banerjee and Bombayala Devi in the team event. They were ranked sixth in the qualifiers. They got a bye in the round of 16, but lost to China by 206-211 in the quarterfinals.

External links
 
 http://www.thehindu.com/todays-paper/tp-national/tp-andhrapradesh/khalleda-school-churning-out-champion-archers/article3068236.ece
 https://web.archive.org/web/20090703061042/http://www.hinduonnet.com/2008/06/30/stories/2008063053081800.htm
 http://www.thehindu.com/todays-paper/tp-sports/Dola-Pranitha-make-it-to-Beijing/article15251424.ece
 https://www.outlookindia.com/magazine/story/taut-as-a-bow-string/238132
 https://web.archive.org/web/20180304090836/http://www.olympic.ind.in/images/BeijingOlympics.pdf
 http://www.indianarchery.info/othdocs/Circulars/SGR_0809.pdf
 https://web.archive.org/web/20080816071739/http://results.beijing2008.cn/WRM/ENG/BIO/Athlete/0/246190.shtml
 https://worldarchery.org/athlete/6289/pranitha-vardhineni

References

Archers at the 2008 Summer Olympics
Olympic archers of India
Archers at the 2014 Asian Games
Indian female archers
21st-century Indian women
21st-century Indian people
Archers from Telangana
Asian Games competitors for India